Cecil Calvert Coursey (1898–1956) was an American architect. From 1929 to 1956, he designed nearly "400 public buildings and churches", including the NRHP-listed Lincoln County Courthouse in North Platte, Nebraska.

References

1898 births
1956 deaths
People from North Platte, Nebraska
Architects from Nebraska
20th-century American architects